The  is a Shinto shrine located in the city of Kashihara, Nara Prefecture, Japan. The Shrine was built in 2 April 1890 at the site of the Kashihara-gū, where Japan's first Emperor, Emperor Jimmu, is said to have acceded to the throne on 11 February 660 BCE.

Access
a 10-minute walk from the center gate of Kashiharajingu-mae Station on Kintetsu Lines (Minami Osaka Line, Yoshino Line, Kashihara Lines).

Gallery

Note

See also
List of Jingū
The Museum, Archaeological Institute of Kashihara, Nara Prefecture

External links

Official Site (Japanese)

Kanpei-taisha
Beppyo shrines
Jingū
Shinto shrines in Nara Prefecture
Important Cultural Properties of Japan